Tujhse He Raabta is a 2015 Pakistani television film directed by Nivdeita Basu and written by Moomal Shunaid. This television film was produced by Saurabh Pandey and co-produced by Yasir Shah under the banner of White Light Army Pictures. It was first aired on Geo Television on 15 February 2015 at 7:00 p.m. in Pakistan.

It features Sara Khan as the lead role in this television film. She rose to fame with her appearance in the Indian soap “Bidaai” while her co-lead, Yasir Shah, is a Pakistani actor, producer, screenwriter and model who started his acting career in India. The special feature of this telefilm is the high-red production camera due to which it has feature film quality.

Cast 

 Sara Khan as Anum
  Yasir Shah as Farhan
 Zara Barring as Sofia
 Yatin Karyekar as Anum's father
 Madhu Anand Chandhok as Farhan's mother
 Anima Pagare as Samaira
 Vicky Thawani as Umair
 Naveed Zakaria as Doctor
 Amaira Thawani as Romaisa (Farhan's Daughter)
 Naman Shaw as Saif (Guest Appearance)

Soundtrack 
The OST is sung, written and composed by Sohail Haider, while Dua Malick was also the co-singer of the original soundtrack. Background music was composed by Durgesh Rajbhatt.

References

External links 

 Official website

2015 films
Geo TV original programming